Oberwölz Umgebung is a former municipality in the district of Murau in Styria, Austria. Since the 2015 Styria municipal structural reform, it is part of the municipality Oberwölz.

Geography
The municipality lies about 15 km northeast of the town of Murau.

References

Cities and towns in Murau District